Lobophytum meandriforme is a species of coral in the genus Lobophytum.

References 

Alcyoniidae
Animals described in 1956